Beverly Buchanan (October 8, 1940 – July 4, 2015) was an African-American artist whose works include painting, sculpture, video, and land art. Buchanan is noted for her exploration of Southern vernacular architecture through her art.

Early life and education 
Buchanan was born in Fuquay, North Carolina, and was raised by her great-aunt and uncle in Orangeburg, South Carolina, where her adoptive father was dean of the School of Agriculture at South Carolina State College—then the only state school for African Americans in South Carolina.

Buchanan spent a considerable amount of time with her father on his trips where he would work with rural farmers, advising them in their farming processes.

In 1962, Buchanan graduated from Bennett College, in Greensboro, North Carolina, a historically black women's college, with a Bachelor of Science degree in medical technology. She went on to attend Columbia University, where she received a master's degree in parasitology in 1968, and a master's degree in public health in 1969. While working in New Jersey, Buchanan applied to medical school; although she was accepted to medical school as an alternate at Mt. Sinai, Buchanan decided not to go due to her desire to dedicate more time to her art. Part of this choice consisted of her decision to "express the images, stories, and architecture of her African American childhood".

Career 
In 1971, Buchanan enrolled in a class taught by Norman Lewis at the Art Students League in New York City. Lewis, along with artist Romare Bearden, became friends and mentors to Buchanan. This relationship with Bearden happened after an accidental incident at a concert where Bearden designed a poster for the event. Buchanan bumped into Norman Lewis backstage while trying to get the Bearden poster signed, and Lewis took Buchanan back stage to meet Bearden. Buchanan later wrote a letter to Bearden reminding him of that event and Bearden became her mentor and had her display her art at the Cinque Gallery. Buchanan decided to become a full-time artist in 1977 after exhibiting her work in a new talent show at Betty Parsons Gallery. In the same year, she moved to Macon, Georgia.

In 1976 and 1977, Buchanan drew "black walls" on paper. She "wanted to see what the wall looked like on the other side" and put four walls together in three dimensions. She then began to sculpt in cement. An example of a three-dimensional work from her early career is the sculpture "Ruins and Rituals" at the Museum of Arts and Sciences in Macon, Georgia, part of a series of concrete structures that recall ancient tombs.

Buchanan is best known for her many paintings and sculptures on the "shack," a rudimentary dwelling associated with the poor. Scholar Janet T. Marquardt argues that Buchanan treats shacks not as documentary elements but as "images of endurance and personal history"; often using bright colors and a style of childlike simplicity, the works "evoke the warmth and happiness that can be found even in the meanest dwelling, representing the faith and caring that is not reserved for privileged classes." Her art takes the form of stone pedestals, bric-a brac assemblages, funny poems, self portraits and sculptural shacks. But potent themes of identity, place and collective memory unite the works uncovering the animus that runs through them: to connect with those around her and reckon with the history that shaped her communities.

Buchanan is noted to have seen viewers sitting on her stone art piece Unity Stones, but let the men remain seated because she did not mind people sitting on her pieces as they contemplated the work and it represented. "The piece serves as a communal place to sit and talk, and do the other things that we do."

Scholar Alex Campbell notes in an essay how Buchanan worked in a studio on College Street in Macon, GA which served as an unofficial racial dividing line for the town. It "separated the working- and middle-class black part of town from the middle-class and affluent white part of town".

In 1981, Buchanan created Marsh Ruins, a temporal land art sculpture in coastal Georgia near a commentated site known as "The Marshes of Glenn." To the east of the work was Saint Simons Island, where a group of Igbo people sold into slavery collectively drowned themselves in 1803. This work bears witness to the unmarked histories of enslaved peoples. There she planted three concrete forms and covered them with layers of tabby, a mixture used in slave living quarters. Marsh Ruins gradually disintegrated into the marsh. Buchanan captured that erosion process on video.

Buchanan said of her work, "My work is a logical progression of my early interest in textures and surfaces and walls. The early "walls" were lonely, freestanding, fragmented things. When I lived in New York I was looking for things that were demolished. That gave them character. I liked to imagine who might have lived in the apartment, and whose home it might have been. Each family that moved in repainted the walls their color. When a building is torn down the various layers of color are exposed. It is almost surgical--like looking through a microscope and looking at different layers of tissue and media."

In an interview with Angela Son, Son asked Buchanan what her concept of home was and Buchanan responded with, "[Home] means what I've stablished and where I am, wherever that is. And it means South Carolina, where I grew up... I consider home as where I grew up."

On July 4, 2015, Buchanan died in Ann Arbor, Michigan at the age of seventy-four. In the fall of 2016 a comprehensive exhibition of her work opened at the Brooklyn Museum in the Elizabeth A. Sackler Center for Feminist Art. Beverly Buchanan - Ruins and Rituals featured painting, sculptures, drawings, as well as the artist's notebooks and photographs form her personal archive.

Buchanan's work was featured at the Independent Art Fair 2017 at Andrew Edlin Gallery's booth. Buchanan has remarked, "A lot of my pieces have the word ‘ruins’ in their titles because I think that tells you this object has been through a lot and survived — that’s the idea behind the sculptures ... it’s like, ‘Here I am; I’m still here!'"

Buchanan's work featured among that of twenty African-American artists in an exhibition at the Turner Contemporary, Margate, Kent, UK in February 2020, entitled 'We Will Walk-Art and Resistance in the American South'.  

Buchanan's work is in the collection of the Addison Art Gallery of American Art at Phillips Academy in Andover, Massachusetts, Georgia Museum of Art, the Metropolitan Museum of Art, the Whitney Museum of American Art, and the High Museum of Art in Atlanta, Georgia.

Awards
 1980: Guggenheim Fellowship and a National Endowment for the Arts Fellowship
 1990: National Endowment for the Arts Fellowship in sculpture
1994: Pollock-Krasner Foundation Award
 1997: Georgia Visual Arts honoree
 2002: Anonymous Was a Woman Award
 2005: College Art Association Committee for Women in the Arts distinguished honoree
 2011: Women's Caucus for Art lifetime achievement award

Selected solo exhibitions
List from exhibition catalogue "9 Women in Georgia"
Traveling retrospective exhibition organized by the Montclair Art Museum to nine museums and college galleries, 1994–96
Steinbaum Krauss Gallery, New York, 1993
Schering-Plough Headquarters Gallery, Madison, NJ, 1992
Three Rivers Art Festival, Pittsburgh, Pennsylvania, 1992
Chrysler Museum, Norfolk, VA, 1992
Jacksonville Art Museum, Florida, 1992
Bernie Steinbaum Gallery, New York, 1991, 1990
Oregon School of Arts and Crafts, Portland, 1991
Greenville County Museum, South Carolina, 1991
Fairleigh Dickenson University, Rutherford, NJ, 1990
Museum of Arts and Sciences, Macon, GA 1990
Southeastern Center for Contemporary Art, Winston-Salem, NC, 1989
Heath Gallery, Atlanta, GA 1987, 1986, 1981
University of Alabama, 1982
Kornblee Gallery, New York, 1981
Truman Gallery, New York, 1978
Mercer University, Macon, GA, 1977
Upsala College, East Orange, NJ, 1974
Cinque Gallery, New York, 1972

References

External links
 
Angela Son Interview
Marcia G. Yerman Interview
Andrew Edlin Gallery
Smithsonian: Beverly Buchanan Papers

1940 births
2015 deaths
Bennett College alumni
Artists from Ann Arbor, Michigan
People from Fuquay-Varina, North Carolina
People from Orangeburg, South Carolina
People from Macon, Georgia
Columbia University Mailman School of Public Health alumni
20th-century American women artists
African-American painters
20th-century African-American women
20th-century African-American people
20th-century African-American artists
21st-century African-American people
21st-century African-American women